Kumanovska Banja or Kisela Voda is a mineral spa in the Proevce 3 km from Kumanovo, North Macedonia. The first registered analysis of the water was in 1920 by Aleksej Scherbakov in the State Laboratory in Belgrade. Kingdom of Serbs, Croats and Slovenians. Analysis proved that the water is Alkaline earth water, with temperature of 28 degrees Celsius and 2.5 liters flow per second. He published the results with title Кисењаци код Жепче и Куманова in 1928. Next analysis took place in 1952 by Aleksandar Butkov the foundlings stated that the temperature is 30 degrees Celsius and 2.37 liters per second flow. Second water sours was discovered that same year by the road to the village of Zubovce with 0.181 liters per second flow and 27 degrees Celsius.
In 1954 the Kumanovo communist local government gave Kumanovo Banja to Biserka company. The spa has not operated since the summer of 2012. The spa has been operating again since 2015.

Notes

References 
Трајковски, Петар (1999). "Кумановска Бања", Кумановска Бања, стр.49-69. (Macedonian)
Дневник 13.07.2011 (Macedonian) 
Радио Слободна Европа 26.07.2012 (Macedonian)

Spa towns in North Macedonia
Kumanovo Municipality